Lestrodus is an extinct genus of edestid fish that lived during the Late Carboniferous. It contains one valid species, L. newtoni, which is known from a single tooth whorl from the Millstone Grit of England. It was originally named as a species of Edestus, but is now considered a distinct genus based on morphological differences.

References

Edestidae
Prehistoric animals of Europe
Prehistoric cartilaginous fish genera